Aux Maniere, later AUX Manir Slobodan Sajin was a contemporary art group from Serbia in 1982-2009, established by Slobodan Šajin (1952–2009) and Momčilo Rajin (1954).

History

First phase: Duo
In 1975, Šajin and Rajin, both historians of art and artists, participated in Serbian conceptual art group "Group 143".

From 1980–1982 Slobodan Šajin worked on silk-screen printing and developed a unique art graphic (print) monotyping technique called "REPRINT" (REcycle PRINT). The technique became the base of the artworks that "Aux Maniere" made in the following several years.

"Aux Maniere" was established in 1982. From 1982 until 1985, group designed record covers for famous Serbian pop-rock groups, such as U škripcu and Laki pingvini.

Second phase: One man group

After Momčilo Rajin left in 1986, Aux Maniere became a one man group - Slobodan Šajin.

From 1986-1990 Aux Maniere produced collections of abstract art paintings.

After the beginning of civil war in Yugoslavia in 1991, Šajin engaged in commercial arts. After the fall of Slobodan Milošević's regime in Serbia (2000), he started again making fine arts. In 2002 he promoted a new art brand, Trash brand AUX MANIR, which became the name of the group.

In his last five years Šajin exhibited in his house garden, place named "Plain air gallery".

Significant exhibitions and works

 1983. "Media Transformations", Museum of Contemporary Art, Belgrade, Serbia
 1984. "Fin de  siecle", Happy Gallery SKC, Belgrade, Serbia
 1985. "Fin the siecle -This is today", City of Zagreb Galleries, Zagreb, Croatia
 1985. "I gioielli della lirica", Happy Gallery SKC, Belgrade, Serbia
 1985. "Suspicious minds", LandsMuseum, Ruma, Serbia
 1986. "Armagedon - Bridges 86", Pavilion "Cvijeta Zuzorić", Belgrade, Serbia
"Aux Maniere", "Verbumprogram", "Alter Imago", Raša Todosijević, Miško Šuvaković, Feđa Klikovac, Dušan Otašević, Halil Tikveša, Era Milivojević, Dragoslav Krnajski, Goran Đorđević
 1986. "Interstellar signalization", Hotel lobby, Ruma, Serbia
 1987. "Groups in Yougoslav art of 80's", Gallery Meander, Apatin, Serbia. "Alter Imago", "Aux Maniere", IRWIN
 1988. "Simulacrum", Mail Art. Small paintings, reprints and flyers. Art works-gifts randomly delivered.
 1989. "The need for picture", Contemporary Gallery, Pančevo, Serbia
 Aux Maniere, Laslo Kerekeš, Sombati Balint, Dragomir Ugren, Varga Somodji Tibor, Rada Čupić, Jozef Ač, Milan Konjovic ...
 1990. "Rosenzwei Collection", Gallery ESC. Belgrade, Serbia: "Alter Imago", "Aux Maniere", Marcus Geiger, Franz West, Raša Todosijević, Apostolović, Klikovac, Susnik, Salamun, Slak, Schubert, Jurić.
 1990. "Materialita: Ground of geometry", Gallery ULUS, 31.October Art salon, Belgrade, Serbia: "Aux Maniere", Sandro Djukić, Marcus Geiger, Dusan Jurić, Fedja Klikovac, Marjetica Potrc, Edita Schubert, Raša Todosijević, Franz West, Heimo Zobernig, "Alter Imago", Willi Kopf
 1990. Aux Maniere works, Landsmuseum, Ruma, Serbia
 1991. "Four Yougoslav art groups", Advertising booklet. Landsmuseum, Ruma, Serbia: "Alter Imago", "Aux Maniere"
 1992. "U Maniru - Mini retrospective", Museum of Yugoslav Kinoteka, Belgrade, Serbia
 2002. "Miscellaneous works", Plain air gallery, Ruma, Serbia
 2003. "Pictures for bedroom", Plain air gallery, Ruma, Serbia
 2005. "Centaur pictures - Cyber incrustatio", Plain air gallery, Ruma, Serbia

External links
 Lidija Merenik. "New Phenomena in the Serbian Painting and Sculpture 1979-1989: A Selective Chronology Art at the end of the century" in: The art at the end of century, Belgrade, 1998.
 AUX MANIR Slobodan Šajin's photostream
 AUX MANIR Slobodan Šajin site
 AUX MANIR at Artsistportoflio.com

Serbian artists
Digital artists
European artist groups and collectives